Oh, Baby! is a 1926 American silent comedy-drama film directed by Harley Knoles and starring David Butler, Madge Kennedy and Creighton Hale.

Cast
 'Little Billy' Rhodes as Billy Fitzgerald 
 David Butler as Jim Stone 
 Madge Kennedy as Dorothy Brennan 
 Creighton Hale as Arthur Graham 
 Ethel Shannon as Mary Bond 
 Flora Finch as Aunt Phoebe 
 Damon Runyon as man at ringside 
 Jimmy Cannon as himself 
 Ring Lardner as himself 
 Graham McNamee as himself
 Grantland Rice as himself 
 Jim Savage as Boxer

References

Bibliography
 Munden, Kenneth White. The American Film Institute Catalog of Motion Pictures Produced in the United States, Part 1. University of California Press, 1997.

External links

1926 films
American sports comedy-drama films
American silent feature films
1920s English-language films
Universal Pictures films
Films directed by Harley Knoles
1920s sports comedy-drama films
American boxing films
American black-and-white films
1926 comedy films
1926 drama films
1920s American films
Silent American comedy-drama films